Donck may refer to:

Adriaen van der Donck (1618–1655), lawyer and landowner in New Netherland
Cluysen-Ter Donck, a hamlet on the Ghent-Terneuzen Canal and the site of the International Regatta KRC Ghent, Belgium
Colen Donck, Dutch-American owned estate north of Manhattan originally owned by Adriaen van der Donck
Flory Van Donck (1912–1992), Belgium professional golfer
Frank Donck, Belgian businessman